Arthur Sellings was the pseudonym of Arthur Gordon Ley, (31 May 1921 – 24 September 1968) an English scientist, book and art dealer, and science fiction author. In addition to Sellings he also wrote under the pen names Ray Luther and Martin Luther. He is best known for his well-crafted portraits of adaptability under stress, in stories noted for their humor, suspense and attention to plot and character. His posthumous novel Junk Day is considered his best work.

Life and career
Ley was born on 31 May 1921 in Tunbridge Wells, Kent, England, the son of Arthur James and Stella Grace (Sellings) Ley. As well as his native town, he also lived in Kensington and, later, Worthing. He married, on 17 August 1945 in Stoke Newington, Gladys Pamela Judge. In addition to his writing, Ley was a book and art dealer and antiquarian and, from 1955 to 1968, a scientific researcher for the British government. His success in a 1955 writing contest sponsored by The Observer led to the publication of his first book, Time Transfer, by Michael Joseph Ltd. His research work inspired some of his science fiction. His work appeared in Fantastic, Galaxy Science Fiction, Imagination, The Magazine of Fantasy & Science Fiction, Nebula Science Fiction, New Worlds, New Writings in SF, and Worlds of Tomorrow, among other periodicals. 
Ley died of a heart attack on 24 September 1968 in Worthing, Sussex, England.

Bibliography

Novels
 Telepath (1962)
 The Uncensored Man (1964)
 The Quy Effect (1966)
 Intermind (as by Ray Luther) (1967)
 The Power of X (1968)
 Junk Day (1970)

Collections
 Time Transfer and Other Stories (1956)
 The Long Eureka: a Collection of Short Stories (1968)

Short stories
 "The Haunting" (1953)
 "The Boys from Vespis" (Feb. 1954)
 "The Departed" (Aug. 1954)
 "A Start in Life" (1954)
 "The Cautious Invaders" (Oct. 1954)
 "The Age of Kindness" (1954)
 "The Mission" (1955)
 "The Figment" (1955)
 "Escape Mechanism" (1955)
 "The Proxies" (1955)
 "Jukebox" (1955)
 "Cry Wolf" (Jul. 1956)
 "Armistice" (Nov. 1956)
 "Birthright" (1956)
 "The Warriors" (Aug. 1956)
 "The Masters" (1956)
 "Categorical Imperative" (1956)
 "Control Room" (1956)
 "Time Transfer" (1956)
 "From Up There" (1956)
 "The Wordless Ones" (1956)
 "The Transfer" (1956)
 "Pentagram" (1956)
 "Soliloquy" (1956)
 "The Awakening" (1956)
 "The Category Inventors" (1956)
 "One Across" (1956)
 "Verbal Agreement" (1956)
 "Fresh Start" (Jul. 1957)
 "Brink of Madness" (1957)
 "Limits" (1958)
 "Blank Form" (1958)
 "The Shadow People" (1958)
 "Flatiron" (1958)
 "The Long Eureka" (1959)
 "For the Colour of His Hair" (1959)
 "The Tycoons" (1959)
 "The Scene Shifter" (1959)
 "The Outstretched Hand" (1959)
 "Starting Course" (1961)
 "The Well-Trained Heroes" (Jun. 1964)
 "The Power of Y" (1965)
 "The Tinplate Teleologist" (1965)
 "Gifts of the Gods" (1966)
 "That Evening Sun Go Down" (1966)
 "The Key of the Door" (1967)
 "The Last Time Around" (1968)
 "Trade-In" (1968)
 "Homecoming" (1968)
 "Crack in the Shield" (Jan. 1968)
 "The Trial" (1969)
 "The Legend and the Chemistry" (Jan. 1969)
 "The Dodgers" (Apr. 1969)

Nonfiction
 "Where Now?" (1961)

References

Notes

Bibliography

 Clute, John and Peter Nicholls. The Encyclopedia of Science Fiction. New York: St Martin's Grifin, 1995. .
 Macdonald, Gina. "Arthur Sellings," in Harris-Fain, Darren (ed.). Dictionary of Literary Biography, Volume 261: British Fantasy and Science-Fiction Writers Since 1960. Shawnee State University, Gale Group, 2002, pages 344–349.

External links
 
 Fantastic Fiction entry

1921 births
1968 deaths
English science fiction writers
20th-century British novelists